Battle Point is a community of Bainbridge Island, Washington, located on the western side of the island.  The northern part of the neighborhood extends to Arrow Point.  Battle Point also contains the communities of Tolo and Venice.

The large Battle Point Park in this neighborhood.  It includes the Edwin E. Ritchie Observatory, the John H. Rudolph Planetarium, the Battle Point Astronomical Association sundial, sports fields, gardens, horse corral, play structure, and other features.

Battle Point is named for a battle when the local Suquamish tribe under chief Kitsap fought off a band of marauders from the north. Arrow Point, forming the western shore of Manzanita Bay, is named for its sharply pointed shape.

See also
 List of Bainbridge Island communities

References

Communities of Bainbridge Island, Washington